The 1914 California gubernatorial election was held on November 3, 1914. Hiram Johnson was elected in 1910 as a member of the Republican Party. Dissatisfaction with the conservatism of the Taft administration led many Republicans to join former President Roosevelt's Progressive Party, with Johnson served as the Vice-Presidential candidate in the 1912 presidential election. Despite losing the general election, and winning California by fewer than 200 votes, Johnson was supremely popular in California. He was re-elected in 1914 as governor under the Progressive Party ticket, nearly tripling his vote from 1910 as a Republican, and was elected and reelected as Senator many times until his death in 1945.

General election results

References
 Our Campaigns

Gubernatorial
1914
California
November 1914 events